The National Herald corruption case is the ongoing case in a Delhi court filed by Indian economist and politician Subramanian Swamy against politicians Sonia Gandhi and Rahul Gandhi, their companies and associated persons. It is alleged that the loan was  not repaid. A closely held company, Young Indian, was incorporated in November 2010 with a paid up capital of 5 Lac and it acquired almost all the shareholding of AJL and all its properties (alleged to be worth ). Swamy alleged criminal misappropriation by both Sonia Gandhi and Rahul Gandhi. (SJ: This case of embezzlement of property of Associated Journals Limited by Young Indian, Sonia Gandhi and Rahul Gandhi. Since it does not involve the used office powers for personal gain, this is case of fraud and embezzlement and not a case of corruption.)

Associated Journals Limited
Associated Journals Limited (AJL) is an unlisted public company limited by shares, incorporated on 20 November 1937, with its registered office at Herald House, 5-A, Bahadur Shah Zafar Marg, New Delhi. It was the brainchild of Jawaharlal Nehru but it was never his personal property as it was started with the support of about 5,000 freedom fighters who became shareholders of AJL. The company's capital was  divided into 2,000 preferential shares worth  each and 30,000 ordinary (equity) shares worth  each. Apart from Nehru, AJL's Memorandum of Association was signed by stalwarts such as Purushottam Das Tandon, Acharya Narendra Dev, Kailash Nath Katju, Rafi Ahmad Kidwai, Krishna Dutt Paliwal and Govind Ballabh Pant. The company did not belong to any particular person, nor did it want to be associated with any business except news. AJL had 1,057 shareholders as of 29 September 2010 as per the annual return filed by the company with the Registrar of Companies.

Motilal Vora has been the chairman and managing director of AJL since 22 March 2002. The company had incurred losses before its holdings were transferred to Young India in 2011.

AJL published the National Herald newspaper in English, Qaumi Awaz in Urdu and Navjeevan in Hindi until 2008. AJL also owns real estate property in various cities including New Delhi, Lucknow, Bhopal, Mumbai, Indore, Patna and Panchkula. The properties of AJL include Herald House, a six-storey building with around 10,000 sq metre office space.

On 21 January 2016 the AJL in its meeting in Lucknow decided to relaunch the three dailies, National Herald and its sister publications, Quami Awaz and Navjivan.

Allegations by other shareholders of usurpation of their shares
After the Delhi High Court dismissed the appeal of Sonia Gandhi and others against the summons issued by the trial court, many shareholders of AJL alleged that no notice was served on them by AJL for any meeting of the shareholders and that the shares held by their fathers have been transferred by AJL to Young Indian fraudulently without their consent in December 2010. These shareholders include prominent individuals such as former law minister Shanti Bhushan and former chief justice of Allahabad and Madras High Courts Markandey Katju.

Young Indian
On 13 December 2010, Rahul Gandhi was appointed director of Young Indian while Sonia Gandhi joined the board of directors on 22 January 2011. Of the company's shares, 76 percent are jointly held by Sonia Gandhi and Rahul Gandhi, and the remaining 24 percent are held by Congress leaders Motilal Vora and Oscar Fernandes (12 percent each). It is described by Rahul Gandhi's office as a "not-for-profit company" which does have commercial operations.

Case
On 1 November 2012, Subramanian Swamy filed a private complaint in a court in Delhi alleging that both Sonia Gandhi and Rahul Gandhi have committed fraud and land grabbing worth  by acquiring a publicly limited company called Associated Journals Limited (AJL) through their owned private company, Young Indian. He also claimed that, through this fraud, they had got the publication rights of the National Herald and Qaumi Awaz newspapers, with real estate properties in Delhi and Uttar Pradesh. He alleged that the acquired properties were given by the government only for the purposes of publishing newspapers, but were used for running a passport office with rental income amounting to millions of rupees.

Swamy argued that it is illegal for a political party to lend money for commercial purposes as per Section 29A to C of the Representation of the People Act, 1951, and Section 13A of Income-tax Act, 1961, and demanded investigation by the Central Bureau of Investigation (CBI) and the de-recognition of the Indian National Congress party for using public money. On 2 November 2012, the party responded that the loan was given only for reviving the National Herald newspaper with no commercial interest.

The hearing of the criminal proceedings case was taken up by the magistrate on various dates while the defendants opposed the petition and asked the magistrate to dismiss it. The court finally observed that prima facie evidence against all the accused was found. The court issued summons to the defendants to appear in the court to defend themselves against all the allegations made in Swamy's complaint.

On 26 June 2014, Metropolitan Magistrate Ms. Gomati Manocha summoned Sonia Gandhi, Rahul Gandhi, Motilal Vora, Oscar Fernandes, Suman Dubey and Sam Pitroda to appear in the court on 7 August 2014. She said that according to the evidence so far, "it appears that YIL was in fact created as a sham or a cloak to convert public money to personal use" to acquire control over  worth of AJL assets. The court noted that all accused persons had allegedly acted "in consortium with each other to achieve the said nefarious purpose/design".

Appeal in Delhi High Court and Supreme Court
The defendants appealed in the Delhi High Court against the summons issued by the magistrate.  On 1 August 2014, Swamy was served notice to file reply in the High Court. On 28 August 2014, the metropolitan court fixed 9 December 2014 for the next hearing of the case. On 12 January 2015, the judge of the Delhi High Court recused himself from hearing the case and directed that the petitions be directed before an appropriate bench.

On 27 January 2015, the Supreme Court of India directed Swamy to make a case for speedy trial in the Delhi High Court which was hearing the appeal of Sonia Gandhi and others against the summons issued to them by the trial court. On plea by Sonia Gandhi and others, defendants requested that the Chief Justice reassign the case to Justice Sunil Gaur, who had recused himself earlier.

On 1 August 2014, the Enforcement Directorate initiated a probe to discover if there was any money laundering in the case. On 18 September 2015, it was reported that the Enforcement Directorate had reopened the investigation.

On 7 December 2015, the Delhi High Court dismissed the appeals of Sonia Gandhi, Rahul Gandhi and five others which included Motilal Vora, Oscar Fernandes, Suman Dubey and Sam Pitroda, and ordered them to appear in person before the trial court on 9 December. The Delhi High Court in its 7 December 2015 judgment noted "criminal intent."

On 12 February 2016 the Supreme Court granted exemption to all the five accused in the case from personal appearances while refusing to quash proceedings against them. Later on 12 July 2016 the Delhi High Court set aside the trial court judgement allowing examination of balance sheets and other documents of Congress party and other two companies, the AJL and Young Indian. The next hearing in the court is scheduled on 20 August.

Trial in the magistrate's court
On 7 December 2015, the Delhi High Court ordered Sonia Gandhi, Rahul Gandhi and five others to appear in person before the trial court on 9 December. They did not appear in the court and, on their lawyers' request, the trial court ordered them to appear before him in person on 19 December. He disallowed their request for exemption from personal appearance. On 19 December 2015 the Patiala House court granted bail to all but one and ordered them to appear in the court on the date of next hearing 20 February 2016.

On 11 March 2016 the trial court allowed, after hearing Subramanian Swamy's plea to examine balance sheets of INC, AJL and Young Indian from 2010 to 2013, which was later overturned by the Delhi High Court.

On 26 May 2018 Subramanian Swamy's application to the trial court seeking a directive for the defendants to verify material filed by Swamy in the National Herald case was denied.

Current status of the case
The Supreme Court allowed the income-tax department to reassess the 2011–12 tax filings of Rahul Gandhi and Sonia Gandhi, even as the Congress leaders await a court verdict on the legality of I-T notices to them.

The top court, however, restrained the department from taking any action against the Congress president and his mother until January 8, 2019, which was the next date of hearing.

The Enforcement Directorate permanently attached properties worth Rs.64 crore in the National Herald Case in May 2019.

See also
 Panchkula-AJL land scam

References

 

 

21st-century scandals
2010 scandals
Cover-ups
Political corruption in India
Criminal investigation
Corruption in India
Deception
Financial scandals
Finance fraud
Scandals in India 
2010s in India
2010 crimes in India
Indian National Congress
Lawsuits
Trials in India